Engeltrude de Fézensac (also Ingeltrud, Ingeltrude, or Ingeltrudis Fidentiacus in contemporary Latin;  – 853) was the Countess of Orléans via her marriage in 825 to Odo I, Count of Orléans. Their eldest daughter, Ermentrude, married Charles the Bald of West Francia. They also had a son, William, who was executed by his own brother-in-law in 866.  

Engeltrude was the only daughter of Leuthard I of Paris and his wife, Grimhilda (also known as Grimeut d'Alsace); her brothers were Adalard the Seneschal and Girart de Roussillon.

Engeltrude was buried in the Basilique Saint-Denis, Paris, France.

References

Medieval Lands Project: Carolingian Nobility — Descendants of Eudes Comte d'Orléans.

790s births
853 deaths
Countesses of Orléans
House of Girard
8th-century Frankish women
9th-century French women
Udalriching dynasty